Edward Waller (1803–1873) was an Irish zoologist.

Life
The son of Thomas Maunsell Waller and Margaret Vereker, Waller was born in Finnoe, County Tipperary. Waller was a land owner and barrister from County Tipperary. He owned Finnoe House, Borrisokane, a
summer home in County Tyrone and the yacht used by the Belfast Dredging Committee of which he was a member (other members were George Crawford Hyndman, George Dickie
and John Gwyn Jeffreys). 
He was interested in Mollusca and Foraminifera 1867-68 and is honoured in the name Aclis walleri
so named by Jeffreys in 1867.

His younger brother was John Francis Waller (1809-1894)

Family
Edward married Mary Crossle on 3 August 1829 at Aughnacloy, County Tyrone. Mary was the only daughter of Henry Crossle of Avaline House in County Tyrone.

Works
Waller, Edward 1867  Report on the Foraminifera obtained in the Shetland Seas. Report Brit. Assoc.(Dundee, 1867), 1867, pp. 44 1 -446. London.
Waller, Edward 1868 Report on the Shetland Foraminifera for 1868. Report Brit. Assoc. (Norwich, 1868), 1868, pp. 340, 341. London.

References

Biographical Etymology of Marine Organism Names (BEMON) 

Irish zoologists
People from Borrisokane
1803 births
1873 deaths